Daley, originally an Irish family name derived from the Gaelic Ó Dálaigh, as a surname, may refer to:

People

Given name
 Daley Blind (born 1990), Dutch footballer
 Daley Mena (born 1985), Colombian footballer
 Daley Ojuederie (born 1985), professional boxer featured on the British TV show Big Brother 14
 Hot Since 82, real name Daley Padley, British DJ
 Daley Peters (born 1984), Canadian curler
 Daley Sinkgraven (born 1995), Dutch footballer
 Daley Thompson (born 1958), British decathlete, born Francis Morgan Thompson
 Daley Williams (born 1986), rugby league footballer

Surname
 Arthur Daley (sportswriter) (1904–1974), columnist for The New York Times
 Ben Daley (born 1988), Australian Rugby League player
 Brian Daley (1947–1996), American science fiction novelist
 Brian E. Daley (born 1940), American Jesuit and theologian
 Bud Daley (born 1932), American professional Major League baseball pitcher 
 Cass Daley (1915–1975), American radio and movie actress
 Clayton Daley (born 1951), chief financial officer of The Procter & Gamble Company
 Debra Daley, New Zealand author
 Denise Daley, Jamaican politician
 Dennis Daley (born 1996), American football player
 Earl Daley (born 1958), Jamaican reggae singer better known as Earl Sixteen
 Eleanor Daley (composer) (born 1955), Canadian composer
 Eleanor "Sis" Daley (1907–2003), wife of former Chicago mayor Richard J. Daley and mother of former mayor Richard M. Daley
 Gareth Daley (born 1989), English musician and soul singer
 George W. Daley (1875–1952), American newspaper editor, sports writer, and syndicated author
 Grace Daley (born 1978), professional basketball player
 Harry Daley, (1901–1971), the first openly gay British police officer
 Jim Daley (born 1953), coach in the Canadian Football League
 Jimmy Daley (born 1973), English cricketer
 John P. Daley (born 1946), American Committeeman in Chicago
 Kevin Daley (born 1976), Panamanian basketball player
 Kevin Daley (politician) (born 1957), American politician
 Laurie Daley (born 1969), Australian rugby league football commentator and former player
 Lloyd Daley (born 1939), Jamaican electronic technician, sound system pioneer and reggae producer
 Louis P. Daley (1868–1930), American politician and farmer
 Michael Daley (born 1965), Australian politician
 Omar Daley (born 1981), Jamaican footballer
 Patricia Daley, Jamaican human geographer and academic
 Pete Daley (born 1930), American catcher in Major League Baseball 
 Richard J. Daley (1902–1976), American Mayor of Chicago, father of Richard M. Daley
 Richard M. Daley (born 1942), American Mayor of Chicago, son of Richard J. Daley
 Spencer Weir-Daley, (born 1953), English footballer
 Steve Daley (born 1953), English footballer
 Tom Daley (diver) (born 1994), British Olympic diver
 Tony Daley (born 1967), English footballer
 Trevor Daley (born 1983), Canadian professional ice hockey player in the National Hockey League 
 Troy Cassar-Daley (born 1952), Maltese-Australian and Aboriginal country musician
 Vi Daley, alderman in the Chicago City Council 1999–2011
 Victor Daley (1858–1905), Australian poet
 William M. Daley (born 1948), White House Chief of Staff to President Barack Obama, United States Secretary of Commerce, brother of Chicago mayor Richard M. Daley

Also
 Daley family, powerful political family in Illinois, U.S.

Fictional characters
 Daley Marin, from the American TV series Flight 29 Down, played by Hallee Hirsh
 Daley Wong, from the OVA series Bubblegum Crisis Tokyo 2040, voiced by Chris Patton
 Arthur Daley, fictional character in the British TV series Minder
 Larry Daley, from the film franchise Night at the Museum, played by Ben Stiller

See also
 Daley Plaza, alternate name for the Richard J. Daley Center in the city of Chicago, Illinois
Daly (disambiguation)
 Dailey, surname
 Daily (disambiguation)
 Dealey (disambiguation)
 Daleyville (disambiguation)
 Ó Dálaigh

English-language surnames
Anglicised Irish-language surnames
Surnames of Irish origin
English-language unisex given names